The Dragonfly Sea is a coming-of-age family novel by Kenyan writer Yvonne Adhiambo Owuor. It was published by Knopf Publishers, imprint of Penguin Random House, in 2019.

References 

2019 novels
Alfred A. Knopf books
Kenyan novels